This is a list of episodes from the first season of Cannon.

Broadcast history
The season originally aired Tuesday at 9:30-10:30 pm (EST).

Episodes

References

Cannon (season 1)